William Hopkinson may refer to:
 William Hopkinson (cricketer), English cricketer
 William C. Hopkinson, Indian police officer, later an immigration inspector in Canada
 William John Hopkinson, Canadian artist